John Neale (1687–1746) of Allesley Park, Warwickshire and Cherington Park, Gloucestershire, was a British landowner and politician who sat in the House of Commons between 1722 and 1741.

Early life
Neale was baptized on 11 July 1687, the eldest son of  Henry Neale  of Allesley Park and his wife Anna Maria Hanbury, daughter of John Hanbury of Freckenham, Suffolk. He matriculated at Pembroke College, Oxford on 29 March 1705, aged 17, and was admitted at Middle Temple in 1705. He married Frances Pope, daughter  of Roger Pope of Oswestry, Shropshire.

Career
Neale was returned as a Whig Member of Parliament for Chipping Wycombe at a by-election on 8 February 1722. At the 1722 general election, he was elected MP for Coventry  on the corporation interest. The election was declared void on 20 November 1722, but he was returned at a new election on 11 December 1722. He was returned unopposed at the 1727 general election. He made his maiden speech at the committee stage of the Excise Bill on 16 March 1733, declaring that his constituents supported the bill, but  on 11 April he seconded a petition from Coventry against the bill presented by William Bromley. At the 1734 general election Neale was defeated by John Bird, a local merchant who stood on the anti-excise platform. Neale recovered his seat in a contest at a by-election on 15 February 1737, but the election was declared void on 22 March 1737. Neale was then returned unopposed at a by-election in 12 April 1737. In 1740, he voted for the place bill. He lost his seat at the 1741 general election and did not stand again.

Later life and legacy
In 1740, Neale replaced the manor house at Cherington with Cherington Park and later he sold the advowson of Allesley to pay the debts arising from his electioneering. He died on 19 December 1746, leaving three daughters. His daughter Frances married Sir John Turner, 3rd Baronet and inherited Cherington Park.

References

1687 births
1746 deaths
Members of the Parliament of Great Britain for English constituencies
British MPs 1715–1722
British MPs 1722–1727
British MPs 1727–1734
British MPs 1734–1741
Members of Parliament for Coventry